Rubén Albés Yáñez (born 24 February 1985) is a Spanish football manager and former player who played as a winger. He is the current head coach of Albacete Balompié.

Playing career
Born in Vigo, Galicia, Albés represented CP Alerta-Traviesas and CD Areosa as a youth. He played as a senior with Rápido de Bouzas, Pontevedra CF B and Céltiga FC before returning to Rápido and subsequently retiring.

Coaching career
Albés started his career with Rápido Bouzas' youth setup, helping the side achieve promotion to the División de Honor Juvenil de Fútbol. In August 2009, shortly after taking over Pontevedra CF's youth sides, he joined Valencia CF to work in their youth categories; also in the 2009–10 season, he was also in charge of CE Universitat València in the regional leagues.

Ahead of the 2010–11 campaign, Albés was appointed manager of Tercera División side Burjassot CF; at the age of 25, he was the youngest manager of all national divisions. In January 2012, after a short period in charge of fellow fourth division side Catarroja CF, he was named Benito Floro's assistant at Wydad AC in Morocco.

On 26 June 2013, back to his home country, Albés took over Novelda CF in division four. On 28 July of the following year, he was appointed Francisco Yeste's assistant at CD Eldense, but was initially the manager as Yeste did not have the necessary coaching badges. Both Albés and Yeste were suspended for three months, with Albés being named manager after the suspension ended.

On 29 June 2015, Albés replaced Rubén de la Barrera at the helm of Real Valladolid Promesas in Segunda División B. In October, after the arrival of Miguel Ángel Portugal in the first team, he was named his assistant.

On 6 June 2016, Albés returned to Valladolid B for the ensuing season. Roughly one year later he took over another reserve team, Celta de Vigo B also in the third division.

On 11 June 2019, Albés was appointed UCAM Murcia CF manager, but was sacked on 7 October. The following 14 June, he was appointed in charge of Liga I side FC Hermannstadt, replacing Vasile Miriuță.

Albés' first professional match occurred on 22 June 2020, a 1–4 away loss against FC Viitorul Constanța. Sacked the following 14 January, he returned to his home country after being named manager of Segunda División side CD Lugo on 20 April 2021.

On 19 May 2022, after avoiding relegation, Albés announced that he would leave Lugo at the end of the season. On 27 June, he replaced Rubén de la Barrera at the helm of Albacete Balompié, recently promoted to the second division.

Managerial statistics

References

External links
 
 

1985 births
Living people
Spanish footballers
Footballers from Vigo
Association football wingers
Tercera División players
Divisiones Regionales de Fútbol players
Spanish football managers
Segunda División managers
Segunda División B managers
Tercera División managers
Novelda CF managers
CD Eldense managers
UCAM Murcia CF managers
CD Lugo managers
Albacete Balompié managers
Liga I managers
FC Hermannstadt managers
Spanish expatriate football managers
Spanish expatriate sportspeople in Morocco
Spanish expatriate sportspeople in Romania
Expatriate football managers in Romania
Celta de Vigo B managers